R.J. MacReady is a fictional character and the main protagonist of the 1982 science fiction horror film The Thing, portrayed by Kurt Russell.

Fictional character biography

R.J. MacReady served as a helicopter pilot in the Vietnam War. Later, at some point, he worked for Hughes Aircraft as a test pilot, before resigning after a conflict with the company's management team. MacReady was eventually stationed as the helicopter pilot at U.S Outpost 31 in Antarctica.

The Thing (1982)

After a Norwegian helicopter pursuing and firing at an Alaskan Malamute comes across Outpost 31, a misfired grenade destroys the helicopter and kills one of the two pilots. The second pilot is killed by station commander Garry and the dog is placed in a kennel. MacReady investigates the Norwegian base, only to find it decimated and all researchers deceased. MacReady uncovers evidence that the Norwegians had dug something out of the ice and finds the burned remains of a deformed monstrous creature with two heads. Returning to their base, they find that the sled dogs were in the process of being assimilated by the Malamute, which turns into a monster, leading to Childs torching the creature with a flamethrower. Blair performs an autopsy on the creature and reveals that the dog had been assimilated by an alien creature capable of absorbing and perfectly imitating other life forms. MacReady returns to the Norwegian base and discovers that the Norwegian team had uncovered a spacecraft in the ice. While MacReady is away, Bennings is assimilated and returns to find Blair has sabotaged the helicopters and tractors, killed the remaining dogs and is currently in the process of demolishing the communications room with a fire axe. MacReady subdues Blair and locks him in the tool shed. The crew individually becomes increasingly paranoid and discovers that the remaining blood samples had been destroyed and Fuchs had committed suicide before The Thing could assimilate him fully. After recovering Fuchs' body, MacReady is locked outside of the base during a blizzard due to suspicions by Childs after uncovering a torn piece of his coat in the snow. MacReady eventually breaks into the storage room and threatens the remaining survivors with dynamite. In the midst of this confrontation, Norris suffers a heart attack. Copper attempts to resuscitate Norris via defibrillation, which causes the Norris-Thing to transform and murder him. After torching the head of the Norris-Thing as it attempts to escape, Clark attempts a mutiny against MacReady which leads to his swift demise.

After Clark's death, the rest of the crew agree to MacReady running a blood sample test with hot wire to see whose blood reacts defensively. Clark is revealed to be uninfected, and the backup pilot Palmer is revealed to have been assimilated and kills Windows before being blown up by MacReady, who then torches Windows' body for safety measures. The remaining survivors (MacReady, Childs, Garry and Nauls) head to the tool shed to check on Blair, only to find he has escaped and gone underground to construct a small flying vehicle. Childs abandons his post at the main gate and MacReady, Garry and Nauls begin destroying the facility in an attempt to kill the creature, which leads to Garry and Nauls being murdered by the infected Blair. MacReady faces off against the creature, attacking it with a stick of dynamite then proceeding to detonate the facility. Wandering through the wreckage, MacReady meets up with Childs, who claims to have gotten lost in the storm chasing Blair. MacReady is skeptical, but with no way to check if Childs is human or not, the two acknowledge their futility and share a drink as the cold closes in.

The Thing (2002 video game)

MacReady returns in the 2002 video game sequel to The Thing to assist the U.S. Rescue Team investigating Outpost 31 in destroying The Thing. MacReady's survival is never explained, though the game is set 3 months after the events at Outpost 31. MacReady has also gotten access to a new working helicopter. One interpretation is that MacReady was captured by bio-technology research company Gen Inc and held as a potential test subject only to escape and steal one of their helicopters. The character appears in the final scene, revealing his identity to Captain Blake and flying his helicopter into the Antarctic horizon.

Production and development

Despite being involved in the production before casting, Kurt Russell was ironically the last person to be cast in the film. By the time Russell was finally cast, the second-unit filming had already begun. MacReady was designed to have been modernized for the contemporary audiences. Screenwriter Bill Lancaster had originally aimed for The Thing to have been an ensemble piece where one person eventually emerged as the protagonist, rather than having a "Doc Savage type hero" from the start. Lancaster's original screenplay had both MacReady and Childs being assimilated in the ending, but director John Carpenter believed the ending to be "too shallow". Actors Tom Atkins and Jack Thompson were strong contenders for the role of MacReady before Russell was cast. Christopher Walken, Jeff Bridges and Nick Nolte were all approached by the studio, but were unavailable. Sam Shepard showed interest in the role but was never considered.

Reception and legacy

Kurt Russell's portrayal of MacReady in the film was largely acclaimed by fans and critics. CBR listed MacReady as the 7th most groundbreaking John Carpenter character, citing Russell's performance as one of the primary reasons the film has returned to public consciousness after the negative initial reception the film received when it was first released.

MacReady and Childs' fate at the end of the film has also been subject to many interpretations. One popular interpretation is that Childs is The Thing, and MacReady is aware of this. When the two of them share a drink, MacReady had given Childs one of the bottles of gasoline he was using for Molotov Cocktails as seen earlier in the film. MacReady is testing Childs to see that if he drinks the gasoline with no worries, he is a Thing.

References

The Thing (franchise)
Male horror film characters
Film characters introduced in 1982
Fictional sole survivors
Fictional aviators
Science fiction film characters
Action film characters